The China national badminton team is a badminton team that represents the People's Republic of China in international badminton team competitions. In addition to the first national team, there is also the second national badminton team of China. Immediately afterward, there is the China National Badminton National Youth Team. All team procedures are managed by the China Badminton Association. The Chinese National Badminton Team is the most successful badminton team in history, having won 10 Thomas Cups, 15 Uber Cups, and 12 Sudirman Cups. China also the only country to achieve a clean sweep gold medal in 2012 Olympics.

History and introduction
After the 2012 Olympics, the Chinese team adjusted the coaching team and merged the original first and second teams. The players are divided into four groups: "men's singles", "women's singles", "men's doubles" and "women's doubles". Chen Jin (women's singles group), Zhang Jun (men's doubles group), and Liu Yong (women's doubles group) served as the head coaches.

Record

**Red border color indicates tournament was held on home soil.

Famous players

Men
Lin Dan
Zhang Jun
Chen Jin
Chen Long
Bao Chunlai
Fu Haifeng
Cai Yun
Guo Zhendong
Xu Chen
Zhang Nan
Chai Biao
Zhao Jianhua
Shi Yuqi
Xia Xuanze
Qiao Bin

Women
Wang Lin
Wang Yihan
Wang Shixian
Wang Xin
Jiang Yanjiao
Ma Jin
Wang Xiaoli
Du Jing
Yu Yang
Tian Qing
Zhao Yunlei
Xie Xingfang
Zhang Ning
Li Xuerui
Gao Ling
Chen Yufei

References

Badminton in China
National badminton teams
Bad